Cincinnati Township, Illinois may refer to the following places:

 Cincinnati Township, Pike County, Illinois
 Cincinnati Township, Tazewell County, Illinois

See also

Cincinnati Township (disambiguation)

Illinois township disambiguation pages